The name Marblehead Light may refer to one of two historic lighthouses in the United States:

Marblehead Light (Massachusetts) in Marblehead, Massachusetts
Marblehead Light (Ohio) in Marblehead, Ohio